Boren may refer to:

People
Boren (surname)
Bo people (China), the Boren of southwest China

Places
Boren (Sweden), a lake in Sweden
Boren, Germany, a municipality in Germany
Bořeň, a phonolite hill in the Czech Republic
Louisa Boren Park, in Seattle, Washington

Other uses
Boren–McCurdy proposals, American intelligence reform proposals 
Borens IK, Swedish football club